Blue Horizon is a blues album by American blues guitarist and singer Rory Block, it was released on 1983 by Rounder Records.

Track listing
"Love My Blues Away" (Block) – 2:56
"Elder Green Is Gone" (Traditional) – 2:42
"Just Like a Man" (Block) – 3:34
"Swing Low" (Traditional) – 3:02
"Ecstasy" (Block) – 4:49
"Feel Just Like Goin' On" (Davis) – 2:12
"Ain't No Way to Do" (Block) – 3:53
"Frankie and Albert" (Traditional) – 2:29
"No Place Like Home" (Block) – 4:52
"Catastrophe Rag" (Block) – 2:33
"Midnight Light" (Block) – 3:21

References

Rory Block albums
1983 albums
Rounder Records albums